Yeh Jawaani Hai Deewani is the soundtrack to the 2013 Hindi film of the same name directed by Ayan Mukerji. Produced by Karan Johar under Dharma Productions banner, the film starred Ranbir Kapoor and Deepika Padukone in lead roles, while Kalki Koechlin and Aditya Roy Kapur play supporting roles. The film's music and score is composed by Pritam with lyrics written by Amitabh Bhattacharya, except for one song written by Kumaar.

The album featured nine tracks in total and was released through T-Series on 29 April 2013. A day before the official album release, the album was made available exclusively on iTunes from 28 April for subscribers, and the audio jukebox was released on YouTube the same day, while the songs were later launched through digital and physical formats. It received positive reviews, praising the compositions, lyrics, choice of singers and the commercial value of the album. The tracks "Badtameez Dil" and "Balam Pichkari" became a chartbusters and repeatedly played in festivals and celebrations, while other tracks also topped music charts. As of January 2022, the album has more than 2.6 billion views on YouTube.

In addition to the commercial response, it received several nominations and awards at various ceremonies. The album won one award each at the Zee Cine, Mirchi Music and International Indian Film Academy Awards, two Star Screen and Producers Guild Film Awards each and three Global Indian Music Academy Awards. It received four Filmfare Award nominations, but did not win in any category. It was one of the strong contenders to win, several awards in music ceremonies, but eventually lost due to the success of the musical album of Aashiqui 2, released at the same year.

Development 
In December 2011, Pritam was chosen as the film's music director, thereby making his maiden association with Dharma Productions, and also replacing their usual collaborators: musicians Vishal–Shekhar and Shankar–Ehsaan–Loy. The album consisted of seven original tracks and two alternative versions. The lyrics for the tracks were written by Amitabh Bhattacharya and Kumaar, and vocals for the tracks were provided by Benny Dayal, Shefali Alvares, Vishal Dadlani, Shalmali Kholgade, Arijit Singh, Rekha Bhardwaj, Tochi Raina, Sunidhi Chauhan, Sreerama Chandra, Shilpa Rao, Nakash Aziz, Harshdeep Kaur and Mohit Chauhan. Azeem Dayani handled the supervision for the film's soundtrack.

In an interview with Akshay Manwani of Scroll.in, Bhattacharya called it as "a fun album" and went on to say "I love writing albums, which have that entire spectrum, the entire range of moods. Yeh Jawaani Hai Deewani was one such album. If it has a ‘Budtameez Dil’ or a ‘Balam Pichkaari’, then it has an ‘Ilaahi’ or a ‘Kabira’ as well [...] I have created the entire mood for the songs in these films. The same has been done by the composer."

Several social media users, criticised that the "Badtameez Dil" is copied from the Bengali folk number "Ranjana Ami Ar Ashbona". Defending the track, playback singer Benny Dayal had said that: "Everyone is enjoying the track which is the positive side of stuff; rather than looking at the negative side you should look at the positive side. The truth will be out at any point of time so there is no point of accusing someone. I am aware of the allegation on Pritam and heard all the tracks of the Bengali film. But I am not sure if it is a copy or not."

The track "Kabira" is a Sufi number, which has two versions. This track, along with Pritam's other song, "Kamli" from Dhoom 3 (2013), served as inspiration for the track "Bulleya" for another Ranbir Kapoor-starrer Ae Dil Hai Mushkil (2016), also composed by Pritam. "Ilahi", sung by Arijit Singh is a travel number. Madhuri Dixit, appeared in the special dance number "Ghagra". For the mastering of the album, Pritam said that "for that film, I gave a master to T-Series and the next day I got a better one so I wanted to change it. They said no but I kept pleading. They finally agreed but were not able to change the New Zealand iTunes version which went live first because of the time difference. Now all the pirates got that master. So I tried to contact them to use the new version." A mashup of all the tracks were released as an additional single on 5 July 2013.

Track listing

Reception 
The music received exceptionally positive response from critics. Critic-based at NDTV (published by Indo-Asian News Service) called the film's soundtrack as "impressive, young and crazy" and wrote "High on energy and beats, it's an out and out fun and masti album. Though the inclination is towards vibrant and youthful compositions, it does have its share of emotional songs." He concluded the review saying that the album is "a must hear for all music enthusiasts". Mohar Basu of Koimoi gave 4 out of 5 to the album, calling it as "one of the year’s most memorable musicals in terms of satisfying songs" and "the album has unbeatable tracks and few understated ones, which balances out in entirety [...] In terms of entertainment, this album is satiating."

Planet Bollywood-based Mitesh Saraf gave 9/10 "Yeh Jawaani Hai Deewani just falls short of becoming the biggest soundtrack of 2013, considering the shelf life of the songs. Although it has every element a Bollywood soundtrack should have, two brilliant dance numbers in the form of 'Badtameez Dil' and 'Balam Pichkari'; two majestic compositions if the form of 'Ilahi' and 'Kabira'; an item number 'Ghagra'..What pulls it back is the two average sounding compositions, 'Dilliwaali Girlfriend' and 'Subhanallah''', not that they are bad but lacks freshness and gives a heard before feeling." He called it as a "fantastic soundtrack which will rule the charts for some time". Bollywood Hungama gave 4 out of 5 stars and said: "Music is the key to the success of a romantic film and in that respect, Yeh Jaawani Hai Deewani is extremely fortunate to have a foot-tapping music score that will take the film places. In most tracks Pritam is in his element and carries on the mega-musical heritage of Dharma Productions' best musicals, a legacy that began with Dostana (1980)."

Writing for the website BollySpice, Bordul Choudary gave 4 out of 5 to the album stating it as "a delicious album that will surely satisfy your musical needs". Suparna Thombare of Bollywoodlife.com gave 3.5 out of 5 stars and called the album as "a great mix of high energy dance numbers, romantic songs and light tracks" and concluded "The soundtrack of this romantic movie is bound to be a lasting pleasure – it’s high on energy and melody!" The Indian Express-based critic Sankhayan Ghosh called the track "Badtameez Dil" as the standout from the album. Vipin Nair of Music Aloud stated "After an unimpressive couple of soundtracks earlier this year, Pritam regains his footing with Yeh Jawaani Hai Deewani" and gave 7.5/10 to the album.

 Chart performance 
The album was considered as one of the "Best Bollywood Albums of 2013" by Indiatimes (Anand Vaishnav), Deccan Music and Milliblog (Karthik Srinivasan). The tracks "Badtameez Dil" and "Balam Pichkari" received huge consumer response and also featured in year-end lists. Deccan Music listed the track "Balam Pichkari" in #27 of "Best Bollywood Songs of 2013", while Milliblog's Karthik Srinivasan and Music Aloud-based Vipin Nair listed "Badtameez Bil" in their year-ender reports as one of the "Best Bollywood Songs of 2013" (#8 and #22). India.com listed the tracks – "Badtameez Dil", "Balam Pichkari", "Dilliwaali Girlfriend" and "Ghagra" in their "best Hindi film dance numbers of 2013". Hindustan Times listed the track "Badtameez Dil" in their year-ender review calling the track as "fun and peppy, which describes the film and its music". The Indian Express also mentioned the album as "full of fun, frolic, celebration and innocent naughtiness". Firstpost-based critic Akshay Manwani, listed it as one of the Best Bollywood Albums of the Decade and further went on to state it as "an album with a distinctly youthful vibe, but one which is also rich with substance". Ormax Media, included the album along with Pritam's two other compositions — Barfi! (2012) and Ae Dil Hai Mushkil'' (2016) — as one of the "decade's best Bollywood albums".

Accolades

Notes

References

External links 

 Yeh Jawaani Hai Deewani (Original Motion Picture Soundtrack) at IMDb
 Yeh Jawaani Hai Deewani at Apple Music

2013 soundtrack albums
2010s film soundtrack albums
Hindi film soundtracks
T-Series (company) soundtrack albums